Three-piece may refer to:

 Three-piece suit
 Three-piece suite
 Trio, three-piece band or act, a musical ensemble of three performers, for example as:
 Jazz trio
 Organ trio
 Piano trio
 Power trio
 String trio
Ronnie Lane or "Three-Piece", a member of Faces

See also 
 Trio (disambiguation)
 Troika (disambiguation)
 Four-piece band
 Quartet
 Two-piece (disambiguation)
 One-piece (disambiguation)